Psychotria trichocalyx is a species of plant in the family Rubiaceae. It is endemic to Tahiti, one of the Society Islands.

References

trichocalyx
Flora of the Society Islands
Critically endangered plants
Taxonomy articles created by Polbot